The following page lists all power stations in Madagascar. The list is not complete. You can assist by adding relevant referenced content.

Hydroelectric

Operational

Proposed

Thermal

Operational

Solar

Proposed

See also 

 List of largest power stations in the world
 List of power stations in Africa

References

External links
 Mini-Grid Market Opportunity Assessment: Madagascar As of March 2019.

Madagascar
 
Power stations